"What If" is a song written, co-produced and performed by American contemporary R&B musician Babyface, issued as the second official single from his sixth studio album Face2Face (following the promotional single "Baby's Mama"). The song peaked at #80 on the Billboard Hot 100 in 2001.

Music video

The official music video for "What If" was directed by Bille Woodruff.

Personnel and credits 

Credits adapted from album liner notes.

 Babyface: lead vocals, background vocals, writer, producer, drum & keyboard programming, bass
 Wayne Lindsey: electric piano
 Paul Boutin: recording engineer
 Jean-Marie Horvat: mix engineer
 Josean Posey: assistant mix engineer

Chart positions

References

External links
 
 

2001 songs
2001 singles
Arista Records singles
Babyface (musician) songs
Music videos directed by Bille Woodruff
Song recordings produced by Babyface (musician)
Song recordings produced by Andre Harrell
Songs written by Babyface (musician)